Abacarus hystrix, the cereal rust mite or grain rust mite, belongs to the family Eriophyidae. Viewing by the human eye requires a 10 – 20X lens. The adult mites are usually yellow but also have been seen to be white or orange. The cereal rust mite was first found on Elymus repens (couch grass), a very common perennial grass species. It has now been found on more than 60 grass species including oats, barley, wheat and ryegrass, found in Europe, North America, South Africa and Australia. Mites migrate primarily through wind movement and are usually found on the highest basal sections of the top two leaf blades. Abacarus hystrix produces up to twenty overlapping generations per year in South Australian perennial pastures, indicating that the species breeds quite rapidly. It has been noted that the cereal rust mite can cause losses in yield of up to 30-70%.

Life cycle
Cereal rust mite eggs are exceptionally small and are placed in leaf vein grooves by the mite. The eggs usually begin hatching at the beginning of spring (March in the Northern Hemisphere and September in the Southern Hemisphere) and once they have reached the juvenile stage, the mites mature very quickly (16–18 days). Once the mites are at the adult stage they often travel to the lower section of the plant where they feed on young tissues. Mites are always present for the full growing season of the plant, but activity has been seen to decrease as the temperature begins to rise, this is because unlike other mite species the cereal rust mite favors cooler temperatures.

Hosts

Impacts of mite on grasses

As a vector
Abacarus hystrix is a vector for two viruses (Agropyron mosaic and Ryegrass mosaic) and also causes direct damage to the leaf.

Agropyron Mosaic Virus
Appearance on hosts is associated with each other, but no direct confirmation of transmission. Likely is a vector, but a low-efficiency one.

Ryegrass Mosaic Virus
The effect of RMV - which is only transmitted by this mite - is chlorotic streaks on the leaves. A. hystrix can only transmit it for 24 hours and all motile instars are potential vectors. Overall A. hystrix and RMV have a close relationship. As soon as RMV begins to noticeably degrade host health, the vector will begin to abandon the plant in favor of healthier neighbors - transmitting it again. Chemical control of the mite controls the virus. There are no resistant varieties and little information on genetic sources of resistance that could be used, but there are virus-resistant varieties.

Not a vector of Wheat Streak Mosaic, although does visit and eat from WSMV victims. Likely reason for lack of successful transmission is degradation of the virus particles during digestion.

Feeding
When the mite feeds on grooves of the leaf surface, it prefers the large cells on the smooth bottom of the groove as opposed to the more ridged, small cells of the side walls. Mite feeding causes direct damage to the leaves, which can be noticed as discoloration or “rusting” of the leaf. There are likely specific biotypes for particular hosts.

Eradication and management options
As a precaution, fields should be checked regularly for mites before spring. By the use of a quadrat system, random plants are selected from different locations in the field. When checking, look for eggs and juvenile mites in the specific area of the leaf veins. A potential management option is to reduce the length of the grass in the cooler months. Studies have shown that trimming grasses reduces the number of mites and since the mites are vectors of many viruses, these viruses are spread less quickly.

References

Eriophyidae
Agricultural pest mites
Animals described in 1896
Arachnids of Australia
Grain production
Taxa named by Alfred Nalepa